Ambrose Lau Hon-chuen, GBS JP (born 16 July 1947) was the chairman of the Hong Kong Progressive Alliance (HKPA), a pro-business and pro-Beijing political party in Hong Kong.

He was a member of the Legislative Council of Hong Kong (LegCo), elected from the constituency of Election Committee. He is a solicitor and notary public. He served as the chairman of the Central and Western District Board from 1988 to 1994, and as President of the Law Society of Hong Kong from 1992 to 1993.

Academic history
LLB, University of London

References

1947 births
Living people
Solicitors of Hong Kong
Alumni of the University of London
Democratic Alliance for the Betterment and Progress of Hong Kong politicians
Recipients of the Gold Bauhinia Star
Hong Kong Progressive Alliance politicians
District councillors of Central and Western District
Members of the National Committee of the Chinese People's Political Consultative Conference
Members of the Provisional Legislative Council
HK LegCo Members 1995–1997
HK LegCo Members 1998–2000
HK LegCo Members 2000–2004
Members of the Preparatory Committee for the Hong Kong Special Administrative Region
Hong Kong Affairs Advisors
Members of the Selection Committee of Hong Kong
Members of the Election Committee of Hong Kong, 2007–2012
Members of the Election Committee of Hong Kong, 2012–2017
Members of the Election Committee of Hong Kong, 2017–2021
Members of the Election Committee of Hong Kong, 2021–2026